Tim Scott (born 1965) is a United States Senator from the state of South Carolina.

Tim or Timothy Scott may also refer to:

Sports
 Tim Scott (American football) (born 1993), American football safety
 Tim Scott (baseball) (born 1966), American pitcher
 Tim Scott (footballer) (born 1971), former Australian rules footballer
 Tim Scott (hurler) (1895–1972), Irish hurler

Others
 Tim Scott (guitarist) (born 1971), British instrumental recording artist
 Tim Scott (artist) (born 1937), British sculptor
 Timothy Scott (actor, born 1955) (1955–1988), American actor and dancer, mainly Broadway
 Timothy Scott (actor, born 1937) (1937–1995), American actor
 Tim Scott McConnell (born 1958), American singer-songwriter, also known as Ledfoot